Walter H. Jurgensen (October 1894 – 1973) was the 20th lieutenant governor of Nebraska, from 1933 to 1938.

Jurgensen was born in Madison, Nebraska in October 1894 to Peter and Sophia (Paulsen) Jurgensen. He attended high school in Spencer, Nebraska and college at the University of Nebraska, and worked in the insurance business. He married Margaret J. Carper of Cass County in 1920.

He was first elected as lieutenant governor in November 1932, defeating Republican incumbent Theodore Metcalfe as part of a Democratic landslide in the state connected to Franklin D. Roosevelt's election as President.  He was re-elected in 1934, defeating C.W. Johnson. And he defeated former lieutenant governor George A. Williams to win re-election to a third-term in 1936. As Lieutenant Governor, he formally opened the first session of the new unicameral Nebraska Legislature in 1937.

He was removed from office in June 1938, after being convicted in March 1938 of embezzling $549 in a stock transaction between a co-defendant and a railroad station agent in September 1934.  Jurgensen contested the conviction and sought renomination for a fourth term as lieutenant governor, but was declared ineligible to participate in the primary.  His successor, Democrat Nate M. Parsons, was elected to fill out the term—and served less than two months.

He was sentenced to serve two to five years, and was freed by the state pardon board in December 1940 after making an unopposed request to be released.

References

Lieutenant Governors of Nebraska
1894 births
1973 deaths
Nebraska politicians convicted of crimes
People from Madison, Nebraska
University of Nebraska alumni
20th-century American politicians